St Benildus College is an all-boys, Catholic secondary school located in Stillorgan, Dublin, Ireland. It was established in 1966 when free secondary education was introduced in Ireland. Founded in 2005, the College was named after the De La Salle Saint, Brother Benildus of Clermont, France. As of 2018, over 800 students were recorded as being current pupils at the school. It is located on the Upper Kilmacud Road in South Dublin on a 25-acre site. Most of the school's students live in the surrounding areas such as Ballinteer, Kilmacud, Sandyford, Dundrum, Goatstown, Stillorgan, Balally, Leopardstown and Ballyogan. St. Benildus College is under the trusteeship of Le Chéile since 2010 but retains its Lasallian ethos.  Several accomplished De La Salle Brothers reside at St.Benildus monastery on the school grounds. The school is administered by an eight-member Board of Management. 

The school is located in an area of south Dublin which was largely farmland until the 1950s and 1960s, when the area became built up with housing estates. The Luas green line is adjacent to the school, and the Kilmacud stop is at the back of the school. In 2009, a new road was opened, named Benildus Avenue, which runs parallel to the Luas line. The new road aims to ease traffic congestion around Sandyford Industrial Estate.

Benildus famously operate under the motto "secundum verbum tuum" which means be a man of your word.

Academics
The school has a higher-than-average percentage of students that will go on to study at third level. In most years St Benildus college has a 100% progression rate of its students on to third level education, with most students progressing to colleges such as UCD and TCD. The Irish Independent asserted that St Benildus college had "the best education money can't buy".

Sports
Students are encouraged to participate in sports including basketball, football, hurling, soccer, rugby, chess, badminton, and athletics. The school has had much success in all of these sports, winning both Provincial and All Ireland honours in many. There is a healthy rivalry between Benildus and the local school Coláiste Eoin. Benildus' hurling and Gaelic players come from local clubs, such as Kilmacud Crokes, Naomh Olaf, Ballinteer St Johns, and the Stars of Erin.

The school also runs a gym which is available to students in 4th year and over, although students who are supervised by a PE teacher can use the facilities.

Further evidence of the college as a major sporting power is that they competed in the Dublin Senior A football final in 2007 and 2008, narrowly losing to close rivals Coláiste Eoin and Portmarnock respectively. But on 19 March 2009, the Students of Benildus went out and won their first ever Dublin senior "A" colleges title. The school had much success in hurling in 08/09. The U-16 hurlers won the Dublin "A" division title, and the U-14 hurlers won the "A" division shield. The Benildus team beat Coláiste Éanna on both occasions. The 1st year soccer team won the Leinster title this year, but they lost the All-Ireland semi-final. In 1998 the college won the U-16 All Ireland soccer title which qualified them to compete in the World Students Cup in Sardinia in 1999. In January 2010, the Senior basketball team reached the U19'A' All Ireland Schools Cup final, narrowly losing out to Oranmore. On 4 May 2010, in O'Toole Park, Benildus retained their Dublin Senior "A" Football crown by beating local rivals Coláiste Eoin 1–8 to 0–7 in the final sparking joyous scenes at the final whistle.

In November 2013 construction of a full-sized astro turf pitch was completed. It consists of one full-sized GAA pitch and two full sized soccer pitches. The facilities are used by local amateur clubs and teams on weeknights, as well as Kilmacud Crokes GAA club on Saturdays.

Yearbook
In 2009, the college produced their first yearbook, titled 'The Frame' which included many articles written by students about trips taken from school and interviews of teachers, along with photos from the school year. Much of the editing work was carried out by a team of 4th year students. The first copies arrived at the school shortly before the school year ended. The yearbook was sold at a cost of €10 per student.

Due to the success of the yearbook, another was produced for the year 09/10 using the same title, but with more content. The Frame ran until 2012/13 with the 2013/14 edition just being called "The St Benildus College Yearbook". The frame made a return in the year 2014/15 but the book being published as paperback.

Notable people

Alumni 
 Danny O'Donoghue; of Irish band The Script.
 David Byrne; Dublin GAA footballer
 David Gillick; twice European indoor athletics gold medalist.
 David Kitt; singer-songwriter.
 Derek Daly; racing driver-Cart, Formula Two, Formula One.
 Diarmaid Ferriter; historian and author.
 Éamon Zayed; Libyan international footballer.
 James Keddy; League of Ireland Footballer
 Joe Lynam; BBC Presenter
 Maurice Pratt; Businessman
 Padraic McMahon; of Irish band The Thrills.
 Paul Cunningham; RTÉ Environment Correspondent.
 Paul Mannion; Dublin GAA footballer
 Ray Cosgrove; Dublin GAA footballer and former All-Star.
 Richard Sadlier; former Ireland international soccer player.
 Rory Cowan; actor and entertainer.
 Willie Burke; League of Ireland footballer
 Philip F. Tyler, actor and television presenter

Staff 
 Aidan Fennelly; Laois footballer.
 Austin O'Malley; Mayo footballer.
 Cormac McAnallen; Tyrone football captain.
 Walter Walsh; Kilkenny Hurler
 Noel McGrath; Tipperary Hurler
 Darragh Fives; Waterford hurler

References

External links
 Official website

Educational institutions established in 1966
Secondary schools in Dún Laoghaire–Rathdown
Boys' schools in the Republic of Ireland
1966 establishments in Ireland